is multi-purpose dam on the Naruse River in the town of Kami, in Miyagi Prefecture, in the Tōhoku region of northern Japan. The dam was completed in 1980. The dam is used for flood control, irrigation, tap water, industrial water, and hydroelectric power generation.

References

External links

Dams in Miyagi Prefecture
Dams completed in 1980
Kami, Miyagi